JSC Barnaul Machine Tool Building Plant is a company based in Barnaul, Russia and established in 1941.

The Barnaul Plant was primarily a small arms ammunition producer. It now produces a wide range of civil products, and has invested in modern technological processes to expand its production.

See also
 Barnaul Cartridge Plant

References

External links
 Official website

Manufacturing companies of Russia
Companies based in Altai Krai
Ministry of the Defense Industry (Soviet Union)
Defence companies of the Soviet Union